The 1981 Senior League World Series took place from August 17–22 in Gary, Indiana, United States. Georgetown, Delaware defeated Danville, California in the championship game. 

Taiwan's streak of nine consecutive SLWS titles ended as they finished in third place. The mark of nine straight championships still stands for all divisions of Little League baseball, and softball.

Teams

Results

References

Senior League World Series
Senior League World Series
1981 in sports in Indiana